Mike Markart (born 1961-08-25 in Graz) is an Austrian author and playwright who was awarded the Würth Literaturpreis in 2001 for his radio drama Magritte.

Plays (selection):
 Die Täter (2002)
 Kalcher (2003)
 Boulevard-Komödie (2003)

Radio dramas (selection):
 Magritte (2000)
 Ich weiss nicht wer ich bin ... (2002)
 Der dunkle Bellaviri (2005)

External links
 www.markart.net
 Würth Literaturpreis

Austrian male writers
1961 births
Writers from Graz
Living people